() is the official motto of Quebec, and translated literally into English means: "I remember." The exact meaning of this short sentence is subject to several interpretations, though all relate to the history of the Quebec people. The motto can be found on all Quebec license plates, among other things.

Origins 
Étienne-Paschal Taché is credited with having popularized the phrase. In 1883, his son Eugène-Étienne Taché, Assistant Commissioner for Crown lands in Quebec and architect of the provincial Parliament building, had the motto carved in stone below the coat of arms of Quebec which appears above the Parliament Building's main entrance door. The motto then came into official use, even though the coat of arms was not adopted until 1939.

Meaning 

 
Taché appears not to have left an explanation of the motto's intended meaning but, however, wrote a letter to Siméon Lesage that showed what he intended to accomplish with the statues on the building's façade and describing what they were intended to remind people of.

All around the Parliament building are 24 statues of historical figures. They originally included founders (Jacques Cartier, Samuel de Champlain and de Maisonneuve), clerics (de Laval, de Brébeuf, Marquette and Olier), military men (de Frontenac, Wolfe, de Montcalm and de Levis), First Nations Peoples, French governors (D'Argenson, de Tracy, de Callières, de Montmagny, d'Ailleboust, de Vaudreuil) and, in the words of Taché, "some English governors the most sympathetic to our nationality" (Murray, Dorchester, Prevost and Bagot) and Lord Elgin, who was given a special place for he was seen as an important player in obtaining "responsible government". Taché purposely left empty spaces to allow future generations to add their own statues.

His contemporaries, however, did not have any trouble interpreting its meaning. The first interpretations that can be cited are those of historian Thomas Chapais and civil servant Ernest Gagnon.

Chapais, during a speech given for the occasion of the unveiling of a bronze statue honouring de Lévis, on June 24, 1895, said: "the province of Quebec has a motto of which she is proud and which she likes enough to carve it on her monuments and palaces. This motto has only three words: ; but these three words, in their simple economy of expression, are worth more than the most eloquent speeches. Yes, we remember.

In 1919, seven years after Taché's death, the historian Pierre-Georges Roy underlined the symbolic character of the three-word motto: "which says so eloquently in three words, the past as well as the present and the future of the only French province of the confederation." This sentence would be cited or paraphrased several times afterwards.

Various scholars have attempted to discover the source of Taché's words. The ethnologist Conrad Laforte has suggested that they might derive from the song , or possibly Victor Hugo's poem . Consequently, Duval believed "the motto of Quebec to be at the same time the translation of the Marquess of Lorne's motto and the answer of a French-Canadian subject of Her Majesty to the said motto."

Research published in English before 1978 led to the same conclusions regarding the motto's origin, the number of words it has and its interpretation. A 1934 biographical notice about Taché reads:"M. Taché is also the author of the beautiful poetic and patriotic motto which accompanies the official coat of arms of the Province of Quebec —  — the full significance of which cannot perhaps be readily expressed in English words but which may be paraphrased as conveying the meaning 'We do not forget, and will never forget, our ancient lineage, traditions and memories of all the past'."Encyclopedias and quotation dictionaries, including those of Wallace, Hamilton, Colombo or Hamilton and Shields, all provide the same information as the French-language sources.

In 1955, the historian Mason Wade added his opinion by writing: "When the French Canadian says , he not only remembers the days of New France but also the fact that he belongs to a conquered people."

Replacement of "La Belle Province" 

In 1978,  replaced the tourism-oriented motto  ("the beautiful province") on Quebec's vehicle registration plate. According to the historian Gaston Deschênes, this event marks the start of a new period of attempts to reinterpret the meaning of the motto in the mainstream media of Canada.

On February 4, 1978, Robert Goyette signed an article entitled "Car owners argue over motto" in The Montreal Star. This article attracted the attention of a reader, Hélène Pâquet, a granddaughter of Taché who replied on February 15 in an open letter entitled . It reads in part:

The lily refers to France while the rose refers to England, both relating to the floral emblems of the nations. The idea that the motto had a lesser known second part spread widely. This new piece of information had a long life in the media before it was investigated by Deschênes in 1992.

When Deschênes contacted Hélène Pâquet in 1992, she was unable to specify the origin of text she quoted in her letter. Her statements were not conformable to those of her father, Lieutenant-Colonel Étienne-Théodore Pâquet Jr., who on March 3, 1939, wrote in a letter to John Samuel Bourque, Tâché's son-in-law, and Minister of Public Works, that "the one who synthesized in three words the history and traditions of our race deserves to be recognized" as much as Routhier and Lavallée who composed the "O Canada".

The origin of the second part is today known to be a second motto, created by the same Eugène-Étienne Taché, many years after the first one, and originally destined to be used on a monument honouring the Canadian nation, but which was never built. The monument was to be a statue of a young and graceful adolescent girl, an allegoric figure of the Canadian nation, bearing the motto: "Née dans les lis, je grandis dans les roses / Born in the lilies, I grow in the roses". While the project was never realized, the idea was "recycled" in a commemorative medal for the 300th anniversary of the foundation of Quebec City, created by Taché, on which is written  ("Born under the lilies, God helping, Champlain's work has grown under the roses").

Other uses 
 is also the motto of the Royal 22e Régiment, a Francophone regiment of the Canadian Forces.

See also
 Je me souviens (2002 film), a documentary film
 Je me souviens (2009 film), a drama film
 List of Canadian provincial and territorial symbols
 , 1842 song by Antoine Gérin-Lajoie that includes

Notes

References 
 English
 Deschênes, Gaston. "Je me souviens", in HistoryWire, March 26, 2009
 Deschenes, Gaston. "Gaston Deschenes on the motto mystery: deciphering the true meaning of Quebec's famous slogan, Je me souviens", in The Beaver: Exploring Canada's History, February 1, 2008 excerpt

 French
 Deschênes, Gaston.
 Deschênes, Gaston.
 Gouvernement du Québec. "La devise du Québec", in the site  of the Government of Quebec, updated January 14, 2008
 Albert, Madeleine and Gaston Deschênes. (online)
 Magnan, Hormisdas (1929). , Québec, 68 p. (online)
 Gagnon, Ernest.

Mottos
Provincial symbols of Quebec
French words and phrases